This article lists the episodes of the television show In Living Color during its five-season run.

Series overview

Episodes
This list is considered far from complete. Some sketches may have been omitted due to lack of evidence. Sources of the sketch titles shown below come from the DVD collection and the televised version shown on FOX, FX, FXX, BET, Centric, Aspire, and Fusion TV.

Season 1 (1990)

Season 2 (1990–91)

Season 3 (1991–92)

Season 4 (1992–93)

Season 5 (1993–94)

Live performances

Season 2
 Queen Latifah
 Monie Love
 Heavy D & the Boyz
 3rd Bass
 D-Nice
 Nikki D
 Rich Nice
 Leaders of the New School
 Another Bad Creation
 KRS-One
 Public Enemy with Ice Cube
 The Afros

Season 3
 Leaders of the New School
 Nice & Smooth
 Big Daddy Kane
 Queen Latifah
 A Tribe Called Quest
 Color Me Badd
 Eric B. & Rakim
 Shabba Ranks with Maxi Priest
 Black Sheep
 Kris Kross
 Jodeci
 Heavy D & the Boyz with 2Pac and Flavor Flav
 MC Lyte

Season 4
 Redman
 Gang Starr with Nice & Smooth
 A.D.O.R.
 Grand Puba
 Wreckx-n-Effect with Teddy Riley
 Pete Rock & CL Smooth
 Mary J. Blige
 Jamie Foxx
 Digable Planets
 Father MC
 Another Bad Creation
 Arrested Development
 Naughty by Nature
 Heavy D & the Boyz
 Prince Markie Dee & The Soul Convention
 Da Youngsta's
 Showbiz and A.G. with Dres
 Onyx
 The Pharcyde

Season 5
 Guru with N'Dea Davenport
 Leaders of the New School
 Lords of the Underground
 Us3
 Patra with Lyn Collins
 Simple E
 Eazy-E with Dresta and B.G. Knocc Out
 Souls of Mischief
 Boss
 Meshell Ndegeocello
 To Be Continued

References

Lists of variety television series episodes
Lists of American comedy television series episodes